Hon. Sam Sam Etetegwung is a Nigerian politician and former member of the Rivers State House of Assembly, Andoni constituency between 2007 and 2011. He was appointed by the former Governor of Rivers State , H.E Rotimi Amaechi as the Special adviser on Primary Education. In 2021, Hon. Sam Sam became the Secretary of the All Progressives Congress in Rivers State.

References

Members of the Rivers State House of Assembly
All Progressives Congress politicians
Living people
Year of birth missing (living people)